Black Site is a 2022 Australian-American action-thriller film directed by Sophia Banks and written by Jinder Ho. The film stars Jason Clarke, Michelle Monaghan, and Jai Courtney. It was released on May 3, 2022, by Vertical Entertainment and Redbox.

Premise
A group of officers based in the Citadel, a top-secret CIA- Five Eyes black site in Jordan, must fight for their lives in a cat-and-mouse game against Hatchet, a brilliant and infamous high-value detainee.

Cast
 Jason Clarke as Hatchet Meyers, a high value detainee 
 Michelle Monaghan as Abigail "Abby" Trent, a CIA PsyOps officer and Citadel second in command 
 Jai Courtney as Raymond Miller,  a CIA contractor and former 1st Battalion marine
 Pallavi Sharda as Tessa Harijan, a CIA officer and translator 
 Fayssal Bazzi as Rashid Nassar, a CIA officer and Citadel Head of Operations 
 Uli Latukefu as Captain David Palau, a Delta Force operator
 Phoenix Raei as Uri Wasserman, a Mossad liaison officer
 Todd Lasance as Wesley, an Australian Army soldier 
 Lincoln Lewis as Landon Briggs, an Australian Army soldier 
 Pacharo Mzembe as Ben Jordan, a US Army soldier
 Simon Elrahi as Farhan Barakat, a Citadel detainee linked to Hatchet
 Jordan Murphy as Silas Allen, a high ranking CIA official

Production
On January 25, 2021, it was announced that Sophia Banks would be directing Black Site, an action-thriller film written by Jinder Ho and starring Jason Clarke, Michelle Monaghan, and Jai Courtney. The following month, principal photography began in Gold Coast, Australia, in the midst of the COVID-19 pandemic, with Uli Latukefu, Pallavi Sharda, Phoenix Raei, and Fayssal Bazzi joining the cast. Filming also took place in Byron Bay, New South Wales. By June 2021, the film was in post-production.

Release
The film was released on May 3, 2022, by Redbox and Vertical Entertainment.

Reception
On the review aggregator website Rotten Tomatoes, 29% from  seven reviews are mixed, with an average rating of 5.0/10.

References

External links
 

American action thriller films
Films about the Central Intelligence Agency
Films produced by Basil Iwanyk
Films shot in New South Wales
Films shot on the Gold Coast, Queensland
2022 action thriller films
2020s English-language films
2020s American films